Râciu is a commune in Mureș County, Transylvania, Romania composed of fifteen villages: Căciulata, Coasta Mare (Nagyoldal), Cotorinau, Curețe, Hagău (Hágó), Leniș (Lenes), Nima Râciului (Rücsinéma), Obârșie, Pârâu Crucii (Keresztpatak), Râciu, Sânmărtinu de Câmpie (Mezőszentmárton), Ulieș (Nagyölyves), Valea Sânmărtinului (Forrásészka), Valea Seacă (Szárazpatak) and Valea Ulieșului (Ölyvespatak). It has a population of 3,752: 90% Romanians, 4% Hungarians and 6% Roma.

See also
List of Hungarian exonyms (Mureș County)

References

Communes in Mureș County
Localities in Transylvania